Roberto Brodsky Baudet (born 1957, Santiago, Chile) is a Chilean novelist and screenwriter. He has written four novels, several film and theater scripts, and over 250 articles published in national newspapers and magazines. Baudet was awarded the 2007 Jaén Prize for Best Novel and the 2009 Martin Nuez Award, both for his 2008 novel Bosque Quemado (Burnt Forest). He lives in New York City with his wife and family. He is Adjunct Professor at the Center for Latin American Studies in Georgetown University.

Novels
2008 – Bosque quemado (Burnt Forest), Premio Jaén - España
2004 – El arte de callar (The Art of Silence)
2001 – Los últimos días de la historia (The Last Days of History)
1999 – El peor de los héroes (The Worst of Heroes)

Short stories
"El crimen de escribir" (The Crime of Writing)
"Con Pasión" (With passion)

Filmography - scripts
2010 – Mi vida con Carlos (My Life with Carlos) - documentary
2007 – El brindis (The Toast)
2005 – Divina Day
2004 – Machuca, co-script writer

Theater - scripts
1986 – La pieza que falta (The Missing Piece), co-author
1983 – Homenaje al surrealismo (Hommage to Surrealism)
1980 – Lily, yo te quiero (Lily, I love you), co-author

Personal life
Roberto Brodsky lives with his wife and children, Pascual, Sam, and Sara.

References

1957 births
Living people
20th-century Chilean novelists
20th-century Chilean male writers
20th-century Chilean short story writers
Chilean male novelists
21st-century Chilean novelists
21st-century Chilean male writers
21st-century Chilean short story writers
Chilean male short story writers
20th-century Chilean dramatists and playwrights
Chilean male dramatists and playwrights
Chilean screenwriters
Male screenwriters